SSSS.Gridman is a 2018 anime television series co-produced by Tsuburaya Productions and Trigger. The series aired from October 7 to December 23, 2018. The series is directed by Akira Amemiya, written by Keiichi Hasegawa, and animated by Trigger. Masayuki Gotou designed Gridman with Masaru Sakamoto handling the other character designs, many of which are directly inspired by characters from the Transformers franchise. Shirō Sagisu composes the music. The opening theme is "UNION" by OxT, and the ending theme is "youthful beautiful" by Maaya Uchida. During their Anime Expo 2018 panel, Funimation announced they licensed the series for streaming on FunimationNow and an English dub. The anime was also licensed by Funimation in the United Kingdom, Ireland, South Africa, Australia, New Zealand, Denmark, Iceland, Norway and Sweden. The anime was simulcast by Crunchyroll in those countries.

On December 14, 2019, a sequel series, SSSS.Dynazenon, was announced at Tsuburaya Production's own convention, Tsubucon. The animation project is a continuation of SSSS.Gridman set in the same shared "Gridman Universe".

On November 15, 2020, it was announced during an Adult Swim YouTube livestream panel that the anime's English dub would premiere on the network's Toonami programming block on January 17, 2021.



Episode list

Notes

References

SSSS.Gridman